Ainslie Wills is an Australian singer-songwriter.

Career

2005–2011: Early EPs 
After graduating from the Victorian College of the Arts in 2005, Wills recorded and produced her debut recording. She collaborated with fellow VCA graduate Lawrence Folvig (Guitar) and Mirra Seigerman (Drums). Wills' first single "Wide Load" received critical acclaim and was supported by Triple J, via the Triple J Unearthed program. In May 2007, Wills released her self-titled debut EP, which included the single "Green Coloured Glass". She supporting Missy Higgins at The Palais in 2007. Wills said "The Unearthed program is an incredible tool for artists, to build their profile, be accessible to the masses and to help them get commercial airplay. I was so fortunate that 'Wide Load' got picked up and everyone at Triple J has been nothing but supportive, it has helped me tremendously."

In 2010, Wills released Somebody for Everyone. Wills told Tone Dead "On my EP, I wrote and demoed all the tracks by myself and just handed them to the band, but (guitarist) Lawrence (Folvig) and I built most of these new songs together, we had really open conversations about ideas for the sounds we wanted and I think it's brought a lot more breadth to the tracks."

2012–2018: You Go Your Way, I'll Go Mine
In April 2012, Wills released "Fighting Kind", the lead single from her debut studio album, You Go Your Way, I'll Go Mine

In February 2015, Wills released "Drive", the lead single from the EP Oh the Gold. "Drive was recorded over two days in Brisbane with co collaborators Lawrence Folvig, Arron Light and producer Matt Redlich. This was followed by "Hawaii" in April 2015. "Hawaii" was recorded in collaboration with guitarist Lawrence Folvig, drummer Arron Light and producer Matt Redlich.

2019–present: All You Have Is All You Need
On 9 August 2019, Wills released All You Have Is All You Need. The album was nominated for the Australian Music Prize.

Discography

Albums

Extended plays

Singles

Other appearances

Awards and nominations

AIR Awards
The Australian Independent Record Awards (commonly known informally as AIR Awards) is an annual awards night to recognise, promote and celebrate the success of Australia's Independent Music sector.

|-
| rowspan="2" | AIR Awards of 2020
|All You Have Is All You Need
| Independent Album of the Year
| 
|-
| "Fear of Missing Out"
| Independent Song of the Year
| 
|-

APRA Awards
The APRA Awards are presented annually from 1982 by the Australasian Performing Right Association (APRA), "honouring composers and songwriters".

|-
| 2017 || herself || Professional Development Award || 
|-
| 2018 || "Running Scared" (Ainslie Wills, Lawrence Folvig) || Song of the Year || 
|-
| 2019 || "Society" (Ainslie Wills, Bram Inscore, MoZella) || Song of the Year || 
|-
| 2020 
| "Fear Of Missing Out" (Ainslie Wills, Paul Dempsey, Lawrence Folvig, Arron Light)
| Song of the Year
| 
|-

Australian Music Prize
The Australian Music Prize (the AMP) is an annual award of $30,000 given to an Australian band or solo artist in recognition of the merit of an album released during the year of award. 

|-
| Australian Music Prize 2019
| All You Have Is All You Need
| Album of the Year
| 
|-

EG Awards/Music Victoria Awards
The Music Victoria Awards (previously known as The Age EG Awards and The Age Music Victoria Awards) are an annual awards night celebrating Victorian music.

|-
| EG Awards of 2012
| herselfself
| Outstanding Achievement By a Victorian Artist
| 
|-

References

Living people
Australian women pop singers
21st-century Australian singers
21st-century Australian women singers
Australian women singer-songwriters
Year of birth missing (living people)